A police woman is a female police officer.

Police woman may also refer to:

 Police Woman (TV series), a 1970s American drama, starring Angie Dickinson
 Police Women (TV series), a 2009 American reality documentary series
 Police Woman (film), a 1974 martial arts movie, starring Yuen Qiu (with a cameo by Jackie Chan)
 Policewomen (film), a 1974 exploitation film
 Policewoman (film), a 1974 Italian comedy film
 The Policewoman, a 2003 Portuguese drama film

See also
 Marie Owens (1853–1927), believed to be the first U.S. female police officer, 1891
 Alice Stebbins Wells (1873–1957), believed to be the first American-born woman police officer, 1910
 Margaret Q. Adams (1874–1974), believed to be the first female U.S. deputy sheriff, 1912